The Painter Otto Dix and His Wife, Martha is a black and white photograph taken by August Sander in 1925–1926. It was included in his photography book Face of Our Time (1931) and in his project People of the 20th Century, released posthumously.

Description
The photograph depicts the painter Otto Dix and his wife Martha Dix seated, with a white background. The portrait of the couple shows them gazing in different directions. Otto, at the right, appears in profile, looking to his wife, with a passive expression. Martha, who wears a bob hairstyle, typical of the 1920s, also appears emotionless, but looks directly at the viewer. This kind of double portrait seems influenced by the austerity and realism noticed in the New Objectivity portraits. The way that Otto Dix is portrayed recalls some of his self-portraits of the same era. Sander himself was influenced by several painters of his time for the work he did then. He stated in 1927 that his purpose was “to see things as they are and not as they should or might be... to tell the truth about our age and people.”

Public collections
There are prints of this photograph at several public collections, including the Städel Museum, in Frankfurt am Main, the Museum of Modern Art, in New York, the International Center of Photography, in New York, The Art Institute of Chicago, the Museum of Contemporary Photography, in Chicago, the Princeton University Art Museum, in Princeton, the Philadelphia Museum of Art, and the Cleveland Museum of Art.

References

1926 in art
1920s photographs
Photographs by August Sander
Black-and-white photographs
Photographs of the Museum of Modern Art (New York City)
Photographs in the collection of the Philadelphia Museum of Art
Photographs of the Art Institute of Chicago